Guist is a village and civil parish in the English county of Norfolk. For the purposes of local government, it falls within the Upper Wensum Ward of Breckland District Council and the Elmham and Mattishall Division of Norfolk County Council.

The villages name means 'Gaega's/ Gaegi's dwelling'

A large part of the village belongs to the Sennowe Park Estate as does all the surrounding land. The estate belongs to the descendants of Thomas Cook who bought it in 1898.

At the crossroads of the A1067 and the B1110 is the estate Clock Tower, a distinctive landmark of the area. The old 1930 bridge on the B1110 to North Elmham was replaced by an eco friendly new bridge in 2002. On the village green is an example of a brick kiln. The medieval church of St Andrew contains a "Green Man" carving on the pulpit.

Twyford House is a Grade II listed manor house on the edge of the village.

The local pub is called The Ordnance Arms, where they have an adjacent Thai restaurant. As well as this business, the village also has a number of prospering farms in and around the local area.

References 

http://kepn.nottingham.ac.uk/map/place/Norfolk/Guist

Villages in Norfolk
Civil parishes in Norfolk
Breckland District